Himal Khabarpatrika is a Nepali language monthly news magazine published by Himalmedia Private Limited. It has developed a choice following of both the rural and urban intelligentsia, maintaining credibility and an inclusive editorial voice. While its readership spans the country, Nepalis worldwide also read it, including the opinion-forming and decision-making classes and the vernacular-elite. Khabarpatrika’s share is a sizeable chunk of the vernacular reading population of Nepal, and the quality of that readership means that the message does get maximum dissemination.

Himal Khabarpatrika Team
Publisher: Kanak Mani Dixit Editor: Santa Gaha Magar

References

External links 
 HimalKhabar.com (Himal Khabarpatrika daily news site)
 Himal Khabarpatrika Homepage
 Himal Southasian Homepage
 Himalmedia Homepage

News magazines published in Asia
Weekly magazines
Magazines established in 1998
Magazines published in Nepal
1998 establishments in Nepal